WNBQ may refer to:

 WOGA (FM), a radio station (92.3 FM) licensed to serve Mansfield, Pennsylvania, United States, which held the call sign WNBQ from 1998 to 2016
 WMAQ-TV, a television station (channel 5) licensed to serve Chicago, Illinois, United States, which held the call sign WNBQ from 1948 to 1964